Johann Balzer (6 August 1738 – 14 December 1799) was an 18th-century Czech engraver in the Kingdom of Bohemia.

Life
Balzer was born in 1738 at Kuks in Bohemia. He was first instructed in art by Michal Rentz, but subsequently completed his education by travelling through Germany, where he visited several Academies. He chiefly resided at Prague, where he produced numerous works, mostly portraits, and died in 1799. He left two sons, Anton (1771–1807) and Johann Karl (1771–1805), who were both engravers, together with his brothers Mathias and Gregor.

Works
His works include:
A set of 50 plates of landscapes and architectural subjects, with Biblical, mythological, and genre groups of figures after Norbert Grund, an old German painter.
Two sets of portraits of artists and learned men of Bohemia and Moravia; published at Prague in the years 1773 to 1782 (90 plates).

References

Sources

External links

1738 births
1799 deaths
People from Trutnov District
People from the Kingdom of Bohemia
18th-century Bohemian people
18th-century artists
Czech engravers